Chilliwack has been a provincial electoral district in the Canadian province of British Columbia since 1916. Incorporating slightly different boundaries, it was the successor riding to the Chilliwhack riding the name of which was based on the older spelling of the name.

Political geography and history 
Chilliwack was the successor riding to Westminster-Chilliwhack, which was one of four subdivisions of the old rural Westminster riding, the others being the ridings that became, after similar name-changes, Delta, Dewdney and Richmond, which are the parent ridings of all current Fraser Valley electoral districts. Chilliwack riding lasted until the 1996 election.  In 2001 the area became represented by Chilliwack-Kent and Chilliwack-Sumas. The latter takes in part of the City of Chilliwack and Sumas Prairie (part of the City of Abbotsford), while the other includes Agassiz, the municipality of Kent, and the Village of Harrison Hot Springs, as well as a certain amount of lands along the banks of the Fraser towards Hope.  Following the 2008 redistribution, Chilliwack was reconstituted, primarily out of Chilliwack-Sumas, while much of Chilliwack-Kent will be joined with parts of the Fraser Canyon previously in Yale-Lillooet to form Chilliwack-Hope.

History

Member of Legislative Assembly 
On account of the realignment of electoral boundaries, most incumbents did not represent the entirety of their listed district during the preceding legislative term. John Les, British Columbia Liberal Party was initially elected during the 2005 election to the Chilliwack-Sumas riding.  He successful ran for re-election in the newly created Chilliwack riding.

Electoral history

Post 2008

|-

 
|NDP
|Mason Goulden
|align="right"|5,908
|align="right"|32.39
|align="right"|

|- bgcolor="white"
!align="left" colspan=3|Total
!align="right"|
!align="right"|18,241
!align="right"|100.00%
|}

Pre 2008
Note: Winners of each election are in bold.

|Liberal
|Edward Dodsley Barrow
|align="right"|987
|align="right"|55.64%
|align="right"|
|align="right"|unknown

|- bgcolor="white"
!align="right" colspan=3|Total valid votes
!align="right"|1,774
!align="right"|100.00%
!align="right"|
|- bgcolor="white"
!align="right" colspan=3|Total rejected ballots
!align="right"|
!align="right"|
!align="right"|
|- bgcolor="white"
!align="right" colspan=3|Turnout
!align="right"|%
!align="right"|
!align="right"|
|}

|-

|Liberal
|Edward Dodsley Barrow
|align="right"|1,911 		 	
|align="right"|53.16%
|align="right"|
|align="right"|unknown

|- bgcolor="white"
!align="right" colspan=3|Total valid votes
!align="right"|3,595  
!align="right"|100.00%
!align="right"|
|- bgcolor="white"
!align="right" colspan=3|Total rejected ballots
!align="right"|
!align="right"|
!align="right"|
|- bgcolor="white"
!align="right" colspan=3|Turnout
!align="right"|%
!align="right"|
!align="right"|
|}
 	

|Liberal
|Edward Dodsley Barrow
|align="right"|1,429	 	
|align="right"|37.83%

|- bgcolor="white"
!align="right" colspan=3|Total valid votes
!align="right"|3,777
!align="right"|100.00%
	  	  	  	  	  	 
  	  	  	  

|- bgcolor="white"
!align="right" colspan=3|Total valid votes
!align="right"|4,675  	 
!align="right"|100.00%
!align="right"|
|- bgcolor="white"
!align="right" colspan=3|Total rejected ballots
!align="right"|79
!align="right"|
!align="right"|
|- bgcolor="white"
!align="right" colspan=3|Turnout
!align="right"|%
!align="right"|
!align="right"|
|}
  	  	  	  	   	 

|Liberal
|Edward Dodsley Barrow
|align="right"|2,273
|align="right"|44.96%
|align="right"|
|align="right"|unknown

|Co-operative Commonwealth Fed.
|John Perriman Wheeler
|align="right"|1,655 	 		
|align="right"|32.73%
|align="right"|
|align="right"|unknown
|- bgcolor="white"
!align="right" colspan=3|Total valid votes
!align="right"| 5,056 	
!align="right"|100.00%
!align="right"|
|- bgcolor="white"
!align="right" colspan=3|Total rejected ballots
!align="right"|70
!align="right"|
!align="right"|
|- bgcolor="white"
!align="right" colspan=3|Turnout
!align="right"|%
!align="right"|
!align="right"|
|}  	  	  	  	 
  	  	  	  	 	  	  	 

|Co-operative Commonwealth Fed.
|Thomas Luxton
|align="right"|1,554 				
|align="right"|24.67%
|align="right"|
|align="right"|unknown
|- bgcolor="white"
!align="right" colspan=3|Total valid votes
!align="right"|6,298 	 
!align="right"|100.00%
!align="right"|
|- bgcolor="white"
!align="right" colspan=3|Total rejected ballots
!align="right"|77
!align="right"|
!align="right"|
|- bgcolor="white"
!align="right" colspan=3|Turnout
!align="right"|%
!align="right"|
!align="right"|
|} 	
	 

|Co-operative Commonwealth Fed.
|Eric Symonds Fowerdew
|align="right"|1,810 	 	 		
|align="right"|25.29%
|align="right"|
|align="right"|unknown

|- bgcolor="white"
!align="right" colspan=3|Total valid votes
!align="right"|7,158  	
!align="right"|100.00%
!align="right"|
|- bgcolor="white"
!align="right" colspan=3|Total rejected ballots
!align="right"|42
!align="right"|
!align="right"|
|- bgcolor="white"
!align="right" colspan=3|Turnout
!align="right"|%
!align="right"|
!align="right"|
|}
  	 

|Co-operative Commonwealth Fed.
|William Thomas Richards
|align="right"|2,295 			
|align="right"|37.63%
|align="right"|
|align="right"|unknown
|- bgcolor="white"
!align="right" colspan=3|Total valid votes
!align="right"|6,099 
!align="right"|100.00%
!align="right"|
|- bgcolor="white"
!align="right" colspan=3|Total rejected ballots
!align="right"|35
!align="right"|
!align="right"|
|- bgcolor="white"
!align="right" colspan=3|Turnout
!align="right"|%
!align="right"|
!align="right"|
|}
  	  	  	  	   	  	   	  	 	  	  	   	 

|Co-operative Commonwealth Fed.
|George Henry Barefoot
|align="right"|2,712 	 	 	 		
|align="right"|22.65%
|align="right"|
|align="right"|unknown

|BC Social Credit League
|Peer Vernon Paynter
|align="right"|2,417 			 		
|align="right"|20.18%
|align="right"|
|align="right"|unknown
|- bgcolor="white"
!align="right" colspan=3|Total valid votes
!align="right"|11,976 
!align="right"|100.00%
!align="right"|
|- bgcolor="white"
!align="right" colspan=3|Total rejected ballots
!align="right"|167
!align="right"|
!align="right"|
|- bgcolor="white"
!align="right" colspan=3|Turnout
!align="right"|%
!align="right"|
!align="right"|
|}

|Progressive Conservative
|Leslie Harvey Eyres
|align="right"|2,097           	 				
|align="right"|13.62%
|align="right"|2,097
|align="right"|13.62%
|align="right"|
|align="right"|unknown

|Liberal
|Alexander Ingvald Hougen
|align="right"|2,543               
|align="right"|16.52%
|align="right"|2,543  	 	
|align="right"|16.52%
|align="right"|
|align="right"|unknown

|Co-operative Commonwealth Fed.
|James John Sutherland
|align="right"|2,242                               
|align="right"|14.57% 
|align="right"|2,242  
|align="right"|14.57%
|align="right"|
|align="right"|unknown
|- bgcolor="white"
!align="right" colspan=3|Total valid votes
!align="right"|15,391       
!align="right"|100.00%
!align="right"|15,391
!align="right"|%
!align="right"|
|- bgcolor="white"
!align="right" colspan=3|Total rejected ballots
!align="right"|421
!align="right"|
!align="right"|
|- bgcolor="white"
!align="right" colspan=3|Turnout
!align="right"|%
!align="right"|
!align="right"|
|- bgcolor="white"
!align="right" colspan=9|8 Preferential ballot; final count is between top two candidates from first count; one count only required in this riding.
|}	  	 	

|Co-operative Commonwealth Fed.
|Emil Anderson 	 	
|align="right"|2,456 	 	 	 	 	 	 		 	       
|align="right"|16.99% 
|align="right"|2,456  
|align="right"|16.99%
|align="right"|
|align="right"|unknown

|Liberal
|Lloyd Truman Beharrell
|align="right"|2,631 	 	 	
|align="right"|18.20% 
|align="right"|2,631 
|align="right"|18.20% 
|align="right"|
|align="right"|unknown

|Progressive Conservative
|Henry Edward Taylor
|align="right"|589 	
|align="right"|4.08% 
|align="right"|589 
|align="right"|4.08%
|align="right"|
|align="right"|unknown
|- bgcolor="white"
!align="right" colspan=3|Total valid votes
!align="right"|14,452 	  		     		  		   	  	       
!align="right"|100.00%
!align="right"|14,452  
!align="right"|%
!align="right"|
|- bgcolor="white"
!align="right" colspan=3|Total rejected ballots
!align="right"|775
!align="right"|
!align="right"|
!align="right"|
!align="right"|
|- bgcolor="white"
!align="right" colspan=3|Total Registered Voters
!align="right"|
!align="right"|
!align="right"|
!align="right"|
!align="right"|
|- bgcolor="white"
!align="right" colspan=3|Turnout
!align="right"|%
!align="right"|
!align="right"|
!align="right"|
!align="right"|
|- bgcolor="white"
!align="right" colspan=9|9  Preferential ballot; final count is between top two candidates from first count; one count only required in this riding..
|}
  	  	  	  	   	  	  	  	  	  	  	  	  	   	 

|Co-operative Commonwealth Fed.
|Michael Kournossoff
|align="right"|2,992 	 	 	
|align="right"|18.97%
|align="right"|
|align="right"|unknown

|Progressive Conservative
|Douglas Grant Burton Taylor
|align="right"|658 	
|align="right"|4.17% 
|align="right"| -  
|align="right"| -.- %
|- bgcolor="white"
!align="right" colspan=3|Total valid votes
!align="right"|15,776  
!align="right"|100.00%
!align="right"|
|- bgcolor="white"
!align="right" colspan=3|Total rejected ballots
!align="right"|138
!align="right"|
!align="right"|
|- bgcolor="white"
!align="right" colspan=3|Turnout
!align="right"|%
!align="right"|
!align="right"|
|}
  	  	  	  	   	   	  	   	 

|Progressive Conservative
|Douglas Grant Burton Taylor
|align="right"|1,173 	 	 
|align="right"|6.34% 
|align="right"|
|align="right"|unknown

|Co-operative Commonwealth Fed.
|Leslie Malcolm Walker Tetlock
|align="right"|4,123 		 	
|align="right"|22.27%
|align="right"|
|align="right"|unknown

|- bgcolor="white"
!align="right" colspan=3|Total valid votes
!align="right"|18,510  
!align="right"|100.00%
!align="right"|
|- bgcolor="white"
!align="right" colspan=3|Total rejected ballots
!align="right"|150
!align="right"|
!align="right"|
|- bgcolor="white"
!align="right" colspan=3|Turnout
!align="right"|%
!align="right"|
!align="right"|
|}
  	  	  	  	   	  	  	  	  	  	  	 

|Progressive Conservative
|Oscar Murray Dayton
|align="right"|1,757 		 	 
|align="right"|10.24% 
|align="right"|
|align="right"|unknown

|Co-operative Commonwealth Fed.
|Leslie Malcolm Walker Tetlock
|align="right"|3,125 			 	
|align="right"|18.21%
|align="right"|
|align="right"|unknown
|- bgcolor="white"
!align="right" colspan=3|Total valid votes
!align="right"| 17,165
!align="right"|100.00%
!align="right"|
|- bgcolor="white"
!align="right" colspan=3|Total rejected ballots
!align="right"|118
!align="right"|
!align="right"|
|- bgcolor="white"
!align="right" colspan=3|Turnout
!align="right"|%
!align="right"|
!align="right"|
|}	  	  	  
  	  	  	  	   	  	   	 

|- bgcolor="white"
!align="right" colspan=3|Total valid votes
!align="right"|12,195	 	
!align="right"|100.00%
!align="right"|
|- bgcolor="white"
!align="right" colspan=3|Total rejected ballots
!align="right"|164
!align="right"|
!align="right"|
|- bgcolor="white"
!align="right" colspan=3|Turnout
!align="right"|%
!align="right"|
!align="right"|
|}  	  	  	 
  	  	  	  	   	   	  	  	   	  	 

|- bgcolor="white"
!align="right" colspan=3|Total valid votes
!align="right"|17,801	
!align="right"|100.00%
!align="right"|
|- bgcolor="white"
!align="right" colspan=3|Total rejected ballots
!align="right"|165
!align="right"|
!align="right"|
|- bgcolor="white"
!align="right" colspan=3|Turnout
!align="right"|%
!align="right"|
!align="right"|
|}  	
  	  	 

|Independent
|Kenneth Leyden Christensen
|align="right"|107 	x 		 	 	
|align="right"|107 	0.49%
|align="right"|
|align="right"|unknown

|Progressive Conservative
|Allan Bryan Holder
|align="right"|4,134 			 		 	
|align="right"|19.07%
|align="right"|
|align="right"|unknown

|- bgcolor="white"
!align="right" colspan=3|Total valid votes
!align="right"|21,677		
!align="right"|100.00%
!align="right"|
|- bgcolor="white"
!align="right" colspan=3|Total rejected ballots
!align="right"|264
!align="right"|
!align="right"|
|- bgcolor="white"
!align="right" colspan=3|Turnout
!align="right"|%
!align="right"|
!align="right"|
|}  		 
  	  	  	  	 

|- bgcolor="white"
!align="right" colspan=3|Total valid votes
!align="right"|26,143 
!align="right"|100.00%
!align="right"|
|- bgcolor="white"
!align="right" colspan=3|Total rejected ballots
!align="right"|79
!align="right"|
!align="right"|
|- bgcolor="white"
!align="right" colspan=3|Turnout
!align="right"|%
!align="right"|
!align="right"|
|} 
   	 
 	  	  	  	 

|Progressive Conservative
|Thomas Fitzgerland (Jerry) Pirie
|align="right"|1,413 	 		 		 	 	
|align="right"|7.66%
|align="right"|
|align="right"|unknown

|- bgcolor="white"
!align="right" colspan=3|Total valid votes
!align="right"|18,441 
!align="right"|100.00%
!align="right"|
|- bgcolor="white"
!align="right" colspan=3|Total rejected ballots
!align="right"|238
!align="right"|
!align="right"|
|- bgcolor="white"
!align="right" colspan=3|Turnout
!align="right"|%
!align="right"|
!align="right"|
|} 
   	  

|Progressive Conservative
|Thomas Matthew Tyson
|align="right"|847 	
|align="right"|3.76%
|align="right"|
|align="right"|unknown

|- bgcolor="white"
!align="right" colspan=3|Total valid votes
!align="right"|22,510  
!align="right"|100.00%
!align="right"|
|- bgcolor="white"
!align="right" colspan=3|Total rejected ballots
!align="right"|289
!align="right"|
!align="right"|
|- bgcolor="white"
!align="right" colspan=3|Turnout
!align="right"|%
!align="right"|
!align="right"|
|} 
   	

|Progressive Conservative
|Gerald James Edward Kirby
|align="right"|446 	 	
|align="right"|2.05%
|align="right"|
|align="right"|unknown
|- bgcolor="white"
!align="right" colspan=3|Total valid votes
!align="right"|21,769  
!align="right"|100.00%
!align="right"|
|- bgcolor="white"
!align="right" colspan=3|Total rejected ballots
!align="right"|300
!align="right"|
!align="right"|
|- bgcolor="white"
!align="right" colspan=3|Turnout
!align="right"|%
!align="right"|
!align="right"|
|} 
   	

|Liberal
|Robert Chisholm
|align="right"|8,601
|align="right"|38.83%
|align="right"|
|align="right"|unknown

|- bgcolor="white"
!align="right" colspan=3|Total valid votes
!align="right"|22,149  
!align="right"|100.00%
!align="right"|
|- bgcolor="white"
!align="right" colspan=3|Total rejected ballots
!align="right"|408
!align="right"|
!align="right"|
|- bgcolor="white"
!align="right" colspan=3|Turnout
!align="right"|%
!align="right"|
!align="right"|
|}

References

Politics of Chilliwack
British Columbia provincial electoral districts
Provincial electoral districts in Greater Vancouver and the Fraser Valley